George Bailey Loring (November 8, 1817 – September 14, 1891) was an American politician and Member of the United States House of Representatives from Massachusetts.

Biography
A son of Unitarian minister Bailey Loring and Sally Pickman (Osgood) Loring, and fourth great grandson of early settler Deacon Thomas Loring, George B. attended Franklin Academy at Andover, Massachusetts and later briefly taught school. He graduated from Harvard University in 1838 and from the Harvard medical school in 1842. He practiced medicine for a short time in North Andover. Served as surgeon of the marine hospital at Chelsea, Massachusetts (1843–1850) and as surgeon of the Seventh Regiment, Massachusetts Volunteer Militia (1842–1844).

He was appointed commissioner to revise the United States marine hospital system in 1849.

Moved to Salem, Massachusetts in 1851; appointed postmaster of Salem on May 4, 1853, and served until his successor was appointed on February 16, 1858.

He was a member of the Massachusetts House of Representatives (1866–1867); chair of the Massachusetts  Republican State Committee (1869–1876); served in the State senate (1873–1876) and was also president of that body.

He was a delegate to the Republican National Conventions in 1868, 1872, and 1876; appointed United States centennial commissioner for the State of Massachusetts in 1872; elected as a Republican to the Forty-fifth and Forty-sixth Congresses (March 4, 1877 – March 3, 1881).

He was an unsuccessful candidate for renomination in 1880. Made United States Commissioner of Agriculture (1881–1885); appointed United States Minister to Portugal in 1889 and served until his resignation in 1890.

Loring married Mary Toppan Pickman (1816-1878), daughter of Dr. Thomas Pickman and his wife, Sophia Palmer Pickman, and also his cousin. His great-uncle, and his wife's uncle, was Benjamin Pickman Jr., Congressman from Massachusetts; his third cousin, once removed, and her first cousin, twice removed was George P. Wetmore, Governor and United States Senator from Rhode Island. Another great-uncle is Samuel Osgood. After Mary's death, Loring married Anna Smith Hildreth, daughter of former U.S. consul to Siam Isaac Townsend Smith and widow of Charles Henry Hildreth, in 1880.

Loring died in Salem, Massachusetts on September 14, 1891, aged 73, and was interred in Harmony Grove Cemetery.

See also
 94th Massachusetts General Court (1873)
 95th Massachusetts General Court (1874)
 96th Massachusetts General Court (1875)
 97th Massachusetts General Court (1876)

References

1817 births
1891 deaths
People from North Andover, Massachusetts
Republican Party Massachusetts state senators
Republican Party members of the Massachusetts House of Representatives
19th-century American diplomats
Ambassadors of the United States to Portugal
19th-century American physicians
Harvard College alumni
Republican Party members of the United States House of Representatives from Massachusetts
19th-century American politicians
American healthcare managers
Massachusetts Republican Party chairs
Burials at Harmony Grove Cemetery
Harvard Medical School alumni